Paulo Fabián Lima Simoes (born 20 January 1992) is an Uruguayan footballer who plays for Central Córdoba SdE.

References

1992 births
Living people
Uruguayan footballers
Uruguayan expatriate footballers
Huracán F.C. players
Montevideo Wanderers F.C. players
Club Atlético Tigre footballers
Sportivo Luqueño players
Deportivo Maldonado players
Central Córdoba de Santiago del Estero footballers
Uruguayan Primera División players
Argentine Primera División players
Paraguayan Primera División players
Association football defenders
Expatriate footballers in Argentina
Expatriate footballers in Paraguay
Uruguayan expatriate sportspeople in Argentina
Uruguayan expatriate sportspeople in Paraguay
Uruguayan people of Brazilian descent